Ezekiel Hopkins (died 1690) was an Anglican divine in the Church of Ireland, who was Bishop of Derry from 1681 to 1690.

Life
He was born in Devon, and was educated at Merchant Taylors' School and Magdalen College, Oxford, where he was a chorister from 1648 to 1653, and graduated B.A. in 1655 and M.A. in 1656. After 1660 he was assistant to William Spurstow in Hackney, but he conformed after the Act of Uniformity 1662, becoming a lecturer in London. In 1666, he became minister of St Mary Arches, Exeter.

Lord Robartes appointed Hopkins his chaplain on becoming Lord Lieutenant of Ireland in 1669. Hopkins became  Treasurer of Christ Church Cathedral, Waterford in 1669. In 1670 he became Dean of Raphoe and the following year Bishop of Raphoe. His translation to Derry was in 1681. Despite being summoned by James II of England to the short-lived Patriot Parliament in Dublin, in 1689 he returned to England, becoming preacher at St Mary Aldermanbury, and dying on 19 June 1690.

Works
His written legacy includes his Expositions of the Ten Commandments, which remains in print in the modern era.

Family
Hopkins married, first, Alicia Moore (d.1681), a niece of Sir Robert Viner, sometime Lord Mayor of London, to whom he dedicated his Vanity of the World. By her, he had two sons, Charles (1664–1700), poet and dramatist, and John (born 1675), the author of Amasia. In 1685, at Totteridge, Ezekiel Hopkins married his second wife, Lady Araminta Robartes, the eldest daughter of John Robartes, 1st Earl of Radnor, by his second wife, Isabella, daughter of Sir John Smith. By his second wife he was the father of Francis, who was the grandfather of  Sir Francis Hopkins M.P., 1st Baronet of Athboy, Co. Meath.

Notes

External links

Attribution

1634 births
1690 deaths
Deans of Raphoe
Anglican bishops of Derry
Anglican bishops of Raphoe
Members of the Irish House of Lords